Dinomenia is a genus of solenogaster, one kind of small, shell-less mollusk.

Species
 Dinomenia hubrechti Nierstrasz, 1902

References

External links
 Nierstrasz, H. (1902). The Solenogastres of the Siboga-Expedition. Siboga-Expeditie. 47: 1-46

Solenogastres